Charles Ryves Maxwell Eley  (16 September 1902 – 15 January 1983) was a British rower who competed in the 1924 Summer Olympics, winning a gold medal with the British coxless four.

Family
Eley was born in Samford, Suffolk, the eldest of four sons of Charles Cuthbert Eley, a barrister and noted gardener, and Ethel Maxwell Ryves. His great-grandfather co-founded the Eley Brothers company. Maxwell was the older brother of banker Sir Geoffrey Eley.

Education and rowing
Eley was educated at Eton College and first rowed at Henley Royal Regatta in 1921, when Eton won the Ladies' Challenge Plate. He then went to Trinity College, Cambridge. At Cambridge, Eley, James MacNabb, Robert Morrison and Terence Sanders, who had rowed together at Eton, made up the coxless four that in 1922 at Henley won the Stewards' Challenge Cup as Eton Vikings and the Visitors' Challenge Cup as Third Trinity Boat Club. They won the Stewards' Challenge Cup again in 1923.  Eley rowed for Cambridge in the Boat Race in 1924 and also won Silver Goblets at Henley in 1924 partnering James MacNabb.

The coxless four crew won Steward's at Henley again in 1924 and went on to win the gold medal for Great Britain  at the 1924 Summer Olympics.

Later life

Eley was with Imperial Chemical Industries. During World War II he was Deputy Controller of Industrial Ammonia Supplies at the Ministry of Supply from 1940 to 1945. After the war he was Director of Nitrogen Supplies at the Board of Trade from 1946 to 1947. He was on the Central Agricultural Control Committee and received the O.B.E in the 1949 New Year Honours.

Eley lived at East Bergholt Place, East Bergholt, Suffolk where he developed the impressive grounds and arboretum that his father had created into one of the finest private gardens in England. His son Robert was the husband of Bridget Cracroft-Eley.

See also
List of Cambridge University Boat Race crews

References

External links

1902 births
1983 deaths
People educated at Eton College
Alumni of Trinity College, Cambridge
People from East Bergholt
English male rowers
British male rowers
Olympic rowers of Great Britain
Rowers at the 1924 Summer Olympics
English Olympic medallists
Olympic gold medallists for Great Britain
Olympic medalists in rowing
Medalists at the 1924 Summer Olympics